Neyyar may refer to:

Neyyar Dam, a dam and surrounding popular tourist spot in Kerala, India
Neyyar River, a river of south-western India in the western ghats
Neyyar Wildlife Sanctuary, a sanctuary in the southern state of Kerala in India